Kornelia Stawicka (born 4 April 1973) is a Polish breaststroke swimmer. She competed in two events at the 1988 Summer Olympics.

References

External links
 

1973 births
Living people
Polish female breaststroke swimmers
Olympic swimmers of Poland
Swimmers at the 1988 Summer Olympics
People from Tczew